3-Hydroxyisobutyryl-CoA deacylase deficiency is a rare autosomal recessive condition that is associated with severely delayed psychomotor development, neurodegeneration, increased lactic acid and brain lesions in the basal ganglia. Fewer than 10 patients have been described with this condition.

Signs and symptoms

These include:
 Delayed motor development
 Hypotonia
 Progressive neurodegeneration
 Seizures

Genetics
This condition is caused by mutations in the HIBCH gene. This gene is located on the long arm of chromosome 2 (2q32).

Pathogenesis

This enzyme is involved in the metabolism of the amino acid valine. Mutations in this enzyme result in the accumulation of methacrylic acid. When this acid is acetylated, it is very reactive with free sulfhydryl groups. When the levels of this enzymes are too low valine levels increase, particularly in the mitochondria.

How this produces the clinical picture is not yet clear.

Diagnosis

This is difficult on clinical grounds alone. It may be suspected by examination of the urine for conjugates of methacrylic acid. The diagnosis is made by sequencing the mutated gene.

Differential diagnosis
 Leigh syndrome

Treatment

There is currently no curative treatment for this condition. Supportive management is all that is currently available.

History

This condition was first described in 1982.

References 

Genetic diseases and disorders
Rare diseases